Brent Sanford (born December 23, 1971) is an American politician who was the 38th lieutenant governor of North Dakota from 2016 to 2023. A member of the Republican Party, he previously was Mayor of Watford City from 2010 to 2016.

Career
Sanford graduated from the University of North Dakota with a bachelor's degree in accounting in 1994. He is a Certified Public Accountant. He worked for Eide Bailly LLP from 1994 through 2002, and then became the chief financial officer of Transwest Trucks in Denver, Colorado. He moved back to Watford City in 2004, taking over his family-run car dealership. He was elected to the Watford City Council in 2006, and became mayor in 2010.

Doug Burgum chose Sanford as his running mate in the 2016 gubernatorial election. The ticket won the general election. They won a second term in the 2020 election. On December 20, 2022, Sanford announced his resignation as lieutenant governor, effective January 2, 2023, in order to return to the private sector and spend more time with his family.

Personal life
Sanford and his wife, Sandra, have three children.

References

External links

|-

1970s births
21st-century American businesspeople
21st-century American politicians
American accountants
Businesspeople from North Dakota
Lieutenant Governors of North Dakota
Living people
Mayors of places in North Dakota
North Dakota city council members
North Dakota Republicans
People from McKenzie County, North Dakota
University of North Dakota alumni